Acanthomyrmex luciolae is a species of ant that belongs to the genus Acanthomyrmex. It was described by Emery in 1893, and is abundant in Sri Lanka and China.

References

luciolae
Insects described in 1893
Insects of Sri Lanka
Insects of China